Neos Marmaras  (Néos Marmarás, "New Marmara") is a town on the Sithonia peninsula, in the Chalkidiki peninsula, Greece. In 2011, Neos Marmaras had 3,352 permanent residents; however, the summer-time population has been estimated at 20,000. The main industries are tourism, agriculture (olives, wine, and honey), and fishing.

History
Most of the residents are originally from Marmara Island, in the Sea of Marmara, and from Parthenonas, a small village on the mountain, Itamos.

Neos Marmaras was formed in 1925 by Greek refugees from Marmara Island following the Asia Minor catastrophe and exchange of populations with Turkey.

In 1970, the traditional inland hill village of Parthenonas was abandoned and these inhabitants moved down to the coast and also settled in Neos Marmaras boosting its population.

Since the 1980s, Neos Marmaras has become a popular tourist town with numerous cafes, restaurants and bars along the waterfront being very busy in the summer months.

Porto Carras
Porto Carras is a big 5-star resort outside Neos Marmaras. It is one of the biggest in northern Greece.
There is also a famous wine from Porto Carras called Domaine Porto Carras.

Settlements
Neos Marmaras has numerous settlements and islands including: 
 Paradeisos, a small settlement close to Neos Marmaras. It has approximately 40 people and lies just downhill of Marmaras in a low-lying area.
 Agia Kyriaki, a very small marina and fishing settlement in a small bay outside Marmaras with some 20 people living there in the summertime.
 Imeri Elia is a small settlement close to Porto Carras. Some older mills are found in the river, Potamos Neou Marmara near Imeri Elia. The area has some 20 people living there in summer.
 Azapiko Beach, a famous beach outside Marmaras, with only 5 people living there in summertime. 
 Kelyfos Island, meaning Shield Island in Greek, is an island located just outside the bay of Neos Marmaras. It is also called Turtle Island, as the island is said to look like a turtle. The island was a strategic hiding point during the ancient days of Greece and in some cases during the Second World War.
 Spalathronisia. This island is located near Azapiko beach. It is the biggest island on the west side of Sithonia peninsula.

Climate
The climate is hot in the summer and mild in the winter, due to its location on higher grounds. The winters are rainier than the summers in Neos Marmaras. It rains a lot in the village, specially winter time but the village has seen snow several times. The areas surrounding Neos Marmaras, especially the village of Parthenonas has seen snow almost every winter.

References

External links 

Find information for Neos Marmaras and every other city of Halkidiki
http://www.portocarras.com/domain-porto-carras.html
http://www.portocarras.com/
Panoramic view of Neos Marmaras

Populated places in Chalkidiki